Haruo Takeuchi (竹内 治夫, Takeuchi Haruo) is a paralympic athlete from Japan competing mainly in category B3 javelin events.

Haruo competed in the B3 category javelin at the 1992 Summer Paralympics winning the gold medal in a Paralympic record of 49.02 metres.

References

External links
 

Paralympic athletes of Japan
Athletes (track and field) at the 1992 Summer Paralympics
Paralympic gold medalists for Japan
Living people
Medalists at the 1992 Summer Paralympics
Year of birth missing (living people)
Paralympic medalists in athletics (track and field)
Japanese male javelin throwers
20th-century Japanese people
Visually impaired javelin throwers
Paralympic javelin throwers